Self-Taught Higher Education Examinations (STHEE) is a test for graduation of higher education and bachelor's degree in China. STHEE allows students to finish studies through self-study without going to school. It is practiced by National Education Examinations Authority (NEEA) of China. NEEA is an agency of the Chinese Ministry of Education.

History
Since 1981, China has held STHEE every year. In 1988, temporary regulations of STHEE was enacted by the State Council of China and the STHEE system combined with self-study, social help and national examinations was confirmed. 

In 1998, the 9th National People's Congress, the legislature in Mainland China, adopted Higher Education Law of the People's Republic of China and Article 21 of the Law states:

A similar test, the Bachelor's Degree Examination for Self-Education, was established in South Korea in the early 1990s.

Major 
Same as students on regular university or college via the National College Entrance Examination, STHEE also has two levels, specialized (equivalent to two- or three- year specialized program in regular) and undergraduate (equivalent to four-year undergraduate program in regular).

Not all majors will be opened in a region and a same major may have different courses by region or examiner university.

Undergraduate
 Economics: 9
 Law: 8
 Education: 11
 Literature: 19
 Science: 5
 Engineering: 46
 Agriculture: 10
 Medicine: 8
 Management: 32
 Art: 9

A total of 157 specific majors.

Specialized 
 Agriculture, Forestry, Husbandry and Fishing: 5
 Natural Resources and Safety: 3
 Energy Power and Materials: 1
 Civil Engineering and Architecture: 6
 Equipment Manufacturing: 9
 Biology and Chemical Engineering: 2
 Food, Medicine and Grain: 3
 Transportation and Communication: 3
 Electronic Information: 8
 Medical and Health: 5
 Finance, Economics and Business: 16
 Tourism: 4
 Culture and Arts: 12
 Journalism and Communication: 3
 Education and Sport: 13
 Public Security and Justice: 3
 Public Management and Service: 5

A total of 101 specific majors.

Organization

Provincial educational examinations authority
Each provincial educational examinations authority(regional EEA) organizes and manages STHEE in its province or municipality or autonomous region. In the military, the People's Liberation Army (PLA), has an independent authority, the STHEE Committee of the Chinese People's Liberation Army(中国人民解放军高等教育自学考试委员会), to organize and manage its STHEE.

Examiner university
The examiner university is a college or university chosen by regional EEA and responsible for participating in the course, rating of papers, holding practical courses including dissertation and issuing degree certificate(undergraduate only).

The examiner universities in the army STHEE are all related to the PLA.

Examinations 
A plan of a major normally has two types of tests, practical courses and written courses which are also categorized into national examinations and provincial examinations, but many majors don't have provincial examinations. 

National examinations is produced by NEEA or others designated by NEEA, and NEEA organizes teachers and experts to write and publish textbooks for it. The content of textbooks and exam refer to the same level of regular university or college.

Provincial examinations and created by region EEA or inter-provincial organizations or the army authority.

Process
National examinations is generally held twice a year, once for two days, in April and October.  Students can freely choose any one to four course(s) in national examination each time.

In several provinces or in the army, provincial examinations is held there twice a year, in January and July. In other provinces, the date may be the day(s) after or before the national performance, it is decided by region EEA or the army authority. 

Practical course is held by examiner university. If the practical course has corresponding written course, student must pass it before taking the practical course. For undergraduate students, practical includes dissertation.

Graduating
Students passing the examinations of all courses that a major requires can be issued a graduate certificate.

For undergraduate students, in order to obtain a bachelor's degree, he/she must meet other requirements by examiner university.

In 2021, the Ministry of Education released a regulation that requires that a university is not allowed to grant the bachelor's degre of the corresponding major in STHEE if the university does not offer that major in regular education. Guangdong province has firstly begun to implement the provision.

See also
 Bachelor's Degree Examination for Self-Education (South Korea)

References

Self education
Education in China
Alternative education